The Battle of Bunker Hill was a small skirmish near Bunker Hill, West Virginia, on July 15, 1861, as part of the Manassas Campaign of 1861.

Skirmish
In early June and July 1861, Union forces under General Robert Patterson advanced through the Shenandoah Valley area of Virginia (modern West Virginia), capturing and occupying towns and villages and skirmishing with local Confederate Militia.

On July 15 a Union force advanced on Bunker Hill and came into contact with a small force of Confederate cavalrymen. In the ensuing skirmish, the Union forces drove the Confederates from the town and occupied the area before proceeding to Charles Town.

Order of battle

The following units were involved in the advance on and skirmish of Bunker Hill.

Union
 21st Pennsylvania Infantry Regiment – Col. John F. Ballier
 23rd Pennsylvania Infantry Regiment – Col. Charles P. Dare
 11th Pennsylvania Infantry Regiment – Col. Phaon Jarrett
 McMullin's [McMullen's] Company, Pennsylvania Independent Rangers – Capt. W. McMullen
 1st Rhode Island Battery – Capt. Charles H. Tompkins
 2nd U.S. Cavalry – detachment

Confederate
 Virginia Militia Cavalry

References

Manassas campaign
Battle of Bunker Hill (1861)
1861 in the American Civil War
1861 in Virginia